The 1955 Mediterranean Games football tournament was the 2nd edition of the Mediterranean Games men's football tournament. The football tournament was held in Barcelona, Spain between the 15–25 July 1955 as part of the 1955 Mediterranean Games.

Participating teams
The following countries have participated for the final tournament:

Venues

Squads

Final tournament
All times local : CET (UTC+1)

Matches

Tournament classification

Winner

Statistics

Goalscorers

References 

1955
Sports at the 1955 Mediterranean Games
1955 in African football
1955 in Asian football
1955